Highgate Springs is an unincorporated community and census-designated place (CDP) in the town of Highgate, Franklin County, Vermont, United States. As of the 2020 census it had a population of 77.

The CDP is in northwestern Franklin County, in the western part of the town of Highgate. It sits on the southeast shore of Missisquoi Bay, an arm of Lake Champlain. U.S. Route 7 passes through the southeast side of the community, and Interstate 89 forms the southeast border. Both highways lead south  to Swanton and north  to the U.S.–Canada border at the Highgate Springs–St. Armand/Philipsburg Border Crossing.

References 

Populated places in Franklin County, Vermont
Census-designated places in Franklin County, Vermont
Census-designated places in Vermont